Midnight blue is a dark blue color.

Midnight blue may also refer to:

 Midnight Blue (TV series), a sexually themed TV show in New York City, hosted by Al Goldstein
 Midnight Blue (cheese) or Aura, a brand of blue cheese made by the Finnish company Valio
 Midnight Blue Belt, a dan rank belt in some Korean martial arts
 Midnight Blue, a 1997 film starring Damian Chapa

Music
 Midnight Blue (Kenny Burrell album)
 Midnight Blue (Graham Collier album)
 Midnight Blue (Love Streaming), a 2021 single album by B.I
 Midnight Blue (Louise Tucker album)
 "Midnight Blue" (Louise Tucker song)
 "Midnight Blue" (Lou Gramm song)
 "Midnight Blue" (Melissa Manchester song)
 Midnight Blue, an album by Twiggy
 "Midnight Blue", a song by Electric Light Orchestra from Discovery
 "Midnight Blue", a song by Enya, a B-side of the single "Wild Child"
 "Midnight Blue", a song by Alkaline Trio from their 2013 album My Shame Is True
 Midnight Blue, a 1980s melodic rock band featuring vocalist Doogie White